Diana Fuss is a professor of literature, film and feminist studies. She serves as Louis W. Fairchild Class of ‘24 Professor of English at Princeton University.

Fuss earned her PhD in English and Semiotics from Brown University in 1988 and then joined the Princeton faculty. 

Her book The Sense of an Interior won the MLA James Russell Lowell Prize for outstanding scholarly book of the year. Her edited collection Inside/Out won both the ALA and VLS best book awards.

The Pocket Instructor offers a collection of 101 exercises for the college classroom.

Works 

 Essentially Speaking (Routledge, 1989)
ed. Inside/Out: Lesbian Theories, Gay Theories (Routledge, 1991)
 Identification Papers (Routledge, 1995)
 The Sense of an Interior: Four Writers and the Rooms that Shaped Them (Routledge, 2004)
 Dying Modern: A Meditation on Elegy (Duke UP, 2013)
 ed. Human, All Too Human (Selected Essays of the English Institute)
 ed. Pink Freud
 ed. with William A. Gleason, The Pocket Instructor: Literature (Princeton University Press, 2015)

References 

Princeton University faculty
Brown University alumni
Year of birth missing (living people)
Living people